This is a list of former and current managers of Crewe Alexandra Football Club. Since 1892, 28 men have managed Crewe; Ernie Tagg had two spells in charge, and Dario Gradi four (including one spell co-managing with Steve Holland). Gradi holds the record for the most games: 1,359 first team games.

Two Crewe managers have been inducted into the English Football Hall of Fame: Gradi in 2004 and Harry Catterick, posthumously, in 2010.

Managers
Key
 Names of caretaker managers are supplied where known, and periods of caretaker-management are highlighted in italics and marked 
 P = matches played; W = matches won; D = matches drawn; L = matches lost; Win % = win percentage
 Win percentage is rounded to two decimal places
 Statistics are complete up to and including the match played on 14 March 2023

Notes

References

Managers
Crewe Alexandra